André Felix Vitus Singer  is a British documentary film-maker and an anthropologist. He is currently Chief Creative Officer of Spring Films Ltd of London, a Professorial Research Associate at the London School of Oriental and African Studies, and emeritus president of the Royal Anthropological Institute of Great Britain and Ireland where he was president from 2014 to 2018.

Born in London, he studied at University Hall, Buckland, then at Keble College, and subsequently at Exeter College, at Oxford University under Professor Sir E.E. Evans-Pritchard, specialising in Iran and Afghanistan for his doctorate. He started working in television in the early 1970s as a researcher, then as a producer and director for the Disappearing World series at Granada Television, eventually taking over from Brian Moser as the Series Editor.

Biography
His wife is anthropologist and writer Lynette Singer.
 
As a director, Singer has made many award–winning films, including the Strangers Abroad series, Khyber, Night Will Fall, Where the Wind Blew, Meeting Gorbachev with Werner Herzog, and  Witchcraft Among the Azande. In television he has worked for several broadcasters, serving as Commissioning editor for Discovery Channel, Europe; Senior Vice-President for Alliance Atlantis; and heading the Independent Documentary Unit at the BBC.

At the BBC, he founded and commissioned works for the Fine Cut series (which later became 'Storyville'), working with such international filmmakers as Jean Rouch, Werner Herzog, DA Pennebaker, Bob Drew, Fred Wiseman and Vikram Jayanti.

In the independent sector, Singer has been instrumental in several production companies including InCa, Café Productions, West Park Pictures, and currently Spring Films. 
He has been responsible in an executive or producer role for hundreds of documentary productions for cinema and television, including the Oscar-nominated Prisoner of Paradise (directed by Malcolm Clarke); Game Over: Kasparov and the Machine (Vikram Jayanti); the Emmy Award nominated City 40 (Samira Goetschel), and the International Critics Award-winning film The Wild Blue Yonder (Werner Herzog).

Since 1992, Singer has worked with Herzog as a producer or executive producer on sixteen productions, including Into the Abyss (2011). He and Lucki Stipetic were producers for Herzog's documentary, Into the Inferno (2016), about mankind's relationship with volcanoes; and in 2019/20 on Fireball : Visitors from Darker Worlds  co-directed by Herzog and Clive Oppenheimer about the world of asteroids. He has (2018) co-directed with Werner Herzog a feature documentary about Mikhail Gorbachev called Meeting Gorbachev based around several encounters between Herzog and the last President of the USSR.  Singer was also an Executive Producer on the multi-award winning documentaries and Oscar Nominees, The Act of Killing (2012) and "The Look of Silence" (2014), by Joshua Oppenheimer.

His film as director, "Where the Wind Blew" (2017) about the legacy of nuclear bomb testing during the Cold War in Kazakhstan and Nevada won the Raven Award for Best Feature documentary at DocUtah, the Utah International Documentary Film Festival.  An earlier film, Night Will Fall (2014), a documentary about the Holocaust that incorporates material made by the British Government in 1945, is described by Stephen Fry as "incredibly dark, deep, disturbing, shocking and brilliant". Night Will Fall was awarded two FOCAL Awards, a Peabody Award, and Best Documentary at the Moscow Jewish Film Festival in 2015; it won the Royal Television Society Award for Historical Documentary and the Emmy for Outstanding Historical Film (Long-form) in 2016. It was shown to over 70 million people world-wide.

Singer was given the Oscar Pomilio Award for Ethics in Pescara, Italy in 2015.  He is the author of five books of non-fiction including, with his wife Lynette, Divine Magic : The World of the Supernatural.  
Singer was elected President of the Royal Anthropological Institute in 2014, was awarded their Patrons Medal in 2007. and was given their Lifetime Achievement Award for film in 2021. He is Adjunct Professor of the Practice of Anthropology at the University of Southern California. and was Visiting Professor of Film at the University of Westminster from 2014 - 2018. He was on the Film and Television Committee of BAFTA, The British Academy of Film and Television Arts, between 2010 and 2013.

Singer was appointed Officer of the Order of the British Empire (OBE) in the 2020 Birthday Honours for services to anthropology and the documentary film industry.

Filmography as director 
’’Black Man’s Burden’’ (1975)
’’A Song for the Time’’ (1977)
’’World in Action x 4’’ (1977-1979)
’’Khyber’’ (1979)
’’The Pathans – Disappearing World’’ (1979)
’’Afghan Exodus’’ (1980)
’’Witchcraft Among the Azande – Disappearing World’’ (1982)
’’The Kazakhs of China – Disappearing World’’ (1983)
’’The Camp on Lantau Island – UNHCR/C4’’ (1984)
’’The Lost Tribes – UNHCR/C4’’ (1984)
’’A Man Without a Horse’’ (1984)
’’Strangers Abroad – 6 part series’’ (1986)
’’The Goddess and the Computer’’ (1988)
’’The Last Navigator’’ (1989)
’’The Hanging Gardens of Arabia’’ (1990)
’’Forbidden Rites – 3 part series’’ (1999)
’’Stairway to Heaven – co-director’’ (2007)
’’Night Will Fall’’ (2015)
’’Where the Wind Blew’’ (2017)
Meeting Gorbachev (2018)

References

External links
Spring Films - Team

University of Southern California, Andre Singer, 13 August 2011
Spring Films, Television Without Frontiers, 13 August 2011
Royal Anthropological Institute, Governance, 13 August 2011
Sheffield Documentary Festival, Andre Singer, 13 August 2011
 Interviewed by Alan Macfarlane 22 April 2015 (video)

1945 births
British film producers
University of Southern California faculty
Living people
Officers of the Order of the British Empire
Fellows of the Royal Anthropological Institute of Great Britain and Ireland
Presidents of the Royal Anthropological Institute of Great Britain and Ireland